Nicholas "Nico" Thomas (born 10 June 1966 in Ambon, Indonesia) was a professional boxer.

Background
Thomas is the 12th of 16 children of Julianus Thomas and Helena Thomas. Nico Thomas is father of 3 sons Devitho, Danitho and Marcellino, from his wife Farida Ade Yani-Thomas. He was trained by his late elder brother, Charles Thomas, a former Indonesian amateur national champion when Nico was only 5 years old.

Amateur career
1985: Silver medalist, SEA (South East Asia) Games, Bangkok 
1986: Gold medalist, President's Cup IX, Jakarta.

Professional career
Thomas became the IBF Strawweight champion after defeating Thai Samuth Sithnaruepol in Jakarta, Indonesia on 17 June 1989. Thomas, known as the second man of Indonesia to win a world boxing title, after Ellyas Pical, lost his title in his first defence against Eric Chavez of the Philippines.

External links
 

1966 births
Living people
People from Ambon, Maluku
Indonesian Christians
Mini-flyweight boxers
World mini-flyweight boxing champions
International Boxing Federation champions
Indonesian male boxers
Sportspeople from Maluku (province)
Southeast Asian Games medalists in boxing
Southeast Asian Games silver medalists for Indonesia
Competitors at the 1985 Southeast Asian Games
20th-century Indonesian people